Us of the Centre (NDC), is a minor Christian-democratic political party in Italy, based in Campania, where it is known also as Us Campanians (Noi Campani). Led by Clemente Mastella, minister of Labour in Berlusconi I Cabinet (1994–1995), minister of Justice in Prodi II Cabinet (2006–2008) and current mayor of Benevento (since 2016), the party is the successor of the Union of Democrats for Europe (UDEUR).

History

In the summer of 2020 Mastella re-organised his followers under the banner of Us Campanians, which obtained 4.4% of the vote and 2 regional councillors, in support of the outgoing President Vincenzo De Luca of the Democratic Party (PD) in the 2020 Campania regional election.

In the 2021 local elections Mastella was re-elected mayor of Benevento.

In November 2021 Mastella launched Us of the Centre in order to compete in countrywide elections. In December, during a party assembly in Rome, Mastella was elected secretary and Giorgio Merlo, a journalist and former long-time deputy of the Italian People's Party (PPI), Democracy is Freedom – The Daisy and the PD from Piedmont, president. Subsequently, Mastella's wife Sandra Lonardo, elected senator for Forza Italia (FI) in the 2018 general election, left that party and joined Cambiamo!'s sub-group in the Senate's Mixed Group, whose name was changed in order to include "Us of the Centre (Us Campanians)" (the sub-group's main name would soon become "Italy in the Centre").

In June 2022, during a party convention in Naples, Mastella proposed an alliance with Matteo Renzi's Italia Viva (IV) and Giovanni Toti's Italy in the Centre (IaC), in a sort of re-edition of the Daisy, which put the UDEUR together with the PPI, The Democrats and Italian Renewal in the run-up of the 2001 general election. Mastella then announced he would run by himself, along with Europeanists to avoid to collect signatures.

Electoral results

Italian Parliament

Leadership
Secretary: Clemente Mastella (2021–present)
President: Giorgio Merlo (2021—present)

References

External links
Official website

Political parties in Campania
Christian democratic parties in Italy
Catholic political parties
Centrist parties in Italy
Political parties established in 2020
2020 establishments in Italy